Bill Long may refer to:
Bill Long (ice hockey) (1917–2006), Canadian ice hockey player and coach
Bill Long (politician) (1927–2000), member of the Indiana House of Representatives from 1973 to 1982
Bill Long (writer) (1932–2010), Irish writer and broadcaster
Billy Long (born 1955), U.S. representative from Missouri since 2011
Bill Long (baseball) (born 1960), American baseball pitcher
Bill Long (artist) (fl. 1990s), American artist and illustrator of MTV's Beavis and Butt-head

See also
 Bill Long Award, Ontario Hockey League award named for the ice hockey player
 William Long (disambiguation)